Symphyotrichum jessicae (formerly Aster jessicae) is a species of flowering plant in the family Asteraceae endemic to Idaho and Washington states in the United States. Its flowers have violet ray florets and yellow disk florets. It is of conservation concern and known only from the Palouse River and Clearwater River drainages of eastern Washington and northwestern Idaho.

Notes

Citations

References

jessicae
Endemic flora of the United States
Flora of Idaho
Flora of Washington (state)
Plants described in 1898
Taxa named by Charles Vancouver Piper